Warrior Run Presbyterian Church is a historic Presbyterian church located at Delaware Township, Northumberland County, Pennsylvania.  It was built in 1835, and is a one-story, red brick building in the Greek Revival style.  The front facade features a pedimented portico supported by four Doric order columns.  The church was restored in 1947, by the Warrior Run chapter of the Daughters of the American Revolution.

It was added to the National Register of Historic Places in 1973.

Gallery

References

External links

Warrior Run-Fort Freeland Heritage Society: History of the Historical Warrior Run Church

Presbyterian churches in Pennsylvania
Churches on the National Register of Historic Places in Pennsylvania
Greek Revival church buildings in Pennsylvania
Churches completed in 1835
19th-century Presbyterian church buildings in the United States
Churches in Northumberland County, Pennsylvania
National Register of Historic Places in Northumberland County, Pennsylvania